The called party (in some contexts called the "B-Number") is a person who (or device that) answers a telephone call. The person who (or device that) initiates a telephone call is the calling party.

In some situations, the called party may number more than one. Such an instance is known as a conference call. In some systems, only one called party is contacted at each event. To initiate a conference call the calling party contacts the first called party, then this person contacts the second called party, but audio is transferred to both called parties.

In a collect call (i.e. reverse charge), the called party pays the fee for the call, when it is usually the calling party that does so. The called party also pays if the number dialed is a toll-free telephone number.

In some countries such as Canada, the United States and China, users of mobile phones pay for the "airtime" to receive calls. In most other countries (e.g. most European countries), the elevated interconnect fees are paid fully by the calling party and the called party incurs no charge.

References

Telephony
Teletraffic

de:B-Teilnehmer